Operator #5 was a pulp magazine published between 1934 and 1939.

Publication history
The lead novels featured Operator #5, whose real name was Jimmy Christopher of the Secret Service. The novels were written by Frederick C. Davis until November 1935, then by Emile C. Tepperman until March 1938, and then Wayne Rogers for the remainder of the run; all three used the house name "Curtis Steele" on all their work for Operator #5.

Contents and reception
The plots always involved science fictional ideas such as revival of the dead, sonic rays that could cause panic, rays that damaged the ionosphere, and future war scenarios. Both Tepperman and Rogers embedded their novels in longer story arcs that went on for many issues, involving the invasion of America. In Tepperman's case the invading force was the Purple Empire; in Rogers' case it was the Japanese, and the sequence was unresolved when the magazine was cancelled in 1939, with the Japanese dropping atom bombs on American cities. The short stories that accompanied the lead novel were often spy stories, and included series with repeating characters such as Red Finger and John Vedders, Secret Service Agents whose adventures were chronicled by Arthur Leo Zagat and Frank Gruber, respectively.

Pulp historian Robert Weinberg regards Operator #5 as "the perfect blend of the single-character pulp and the science fiction magazine", praising the early stories by Frederick C. Davis in particular.  Pulp historian Wooda Nicholas Carr agrees: "Operator #5 was, and continues to be, regarded as one of the greatest pulp heroes found in the pages behind the gaudy covers that attracted so many".

Bibliographic details 
The publisher was Popular Publications of New York; the editor was Rogers Terrill. It began as a monthly; April 1936 was followed by June/July 1936, inaugurating a bimonthly period that ran to the last issue, November/December 1939, except for a brief monthly period: October/November 1936 was followed by December 1936, January and February 1937, and then by March/April 1937.  There were 48 issues, in twelve volumes of four issues; the September/October 1938 issue was mislabelled 11/5 instead of 11/1. The page count began at 128 pages, and dropped to 112 pages with the October 1935 issue. The price was 10 cents through the magazine's run.

References

Sources 
 
 

Magazines established in 1934
Magazines disestablished in 1939
Magazines published in New York City
Pulp magazines